The Other Side of the Road is the sixth studio album by British rock band Smokie, released in 1979. When the album was released on CD in the 2000s, it was taken from a vinyl source.

Track listing

Charts

Personnel
Smokie
Chris Norman - lead and backing vocals, guitars, keyboards, synthesizer, banjo, percussion
Terry Uttley  - bass guitar, lead and backing vocals
Pete Spencer  - drums, percussion, acoustic guitar, vocals
Alan Silson  - lead guitar, acoustic guitar, guitar synth, lead and backing vocals

Notes

References

1979 albums
Rak Records albums
Smokie (band) albums